Rahmi is a masculine Arabic and Turkish given name, it may refer to:

People
 Bedri Rahmi Eyüboğlu (1913-1975), Turkish painter and poet
 Hüseyin Rahmi Gürpınar (1864–1944), Turkish writer and politician
 Rahmi Koç (born 1930), Turkish businessman
 Rahmi Özcan (born 1990), Turkish amputee footballer

Places
 Rahmi M. Koç Museum, private industrial museum in Istanbul, Turkey

Arabic masculine given names
Turkish masculine given names